Vilkij-e Shomali Rural District is in the Central District of Namin County, Ardabil province, Iran. At the census of 2006, its population was 5,966 in 1,423 households; there were 5,551 inhabitants in 1,630 households at the following census of 2011; and in the most recent census of 2016, the population of the rural district was 4,996 in 1,558 households. The largest of its 21 villages was Naneh Karan, with 935 people.

References 

Namin County

Rural Districts of Ardabil Province

Populated places in Ardabil Province

Populated places in Namin County